Probezzia albitibia is a species of biting midges in the family Ceratopogonidae.

References

Further reading

External links

 

Ceratopogonidae
Articles created by Qbugbot
Insects described in 1971